is a Japanese former professional footballer who played as a midfielder.

Playing career
Okubo was born in Nagasaki Prefecture on 3 May 1975. After graduating from Fukuoka University, he joined J1 League club Sanfrecce Hiroshima in 1998. Although he played as offensive midfielder, he could not play many matches for injury and behind Toshihiro Yamaguchi and Chikara Fujimoto. He retired end of 2000 season.

Club statistics

References

External links

biglobe.ne.jp

1975 births
Living people
Fukuoka University alumni
Association football people from Nagasaki Prefecture
Japanese footballers
J1 League players
Sanfrecce Hiroshima players
Association football midfielders